Sir Sly is an American indie rock band formed and based in Orange County, California, United States. The band is fronted by vocalist Landon Jacobs with instrumentalists Jason Suwito and Hayden Coplen accompanying him. The trio gradually built a steady following and managed to top The Hype Machine chart, eventually revealing their identities.

Their debut single, "Ghost", was released on March 4, 2013, on the National Anthem and Neon Gold labels followed by the single "Gold" on May 21, 2013. "Gold" peaked at No. 27 on the Billboard Alternative Songs chart and No. 45 on the Rock Airplay chart. "Gold" is also featured in the video game, MLB 14: The Show.

They gained international fame after the Assassin's Creed IV: Black Flag accolade trailer was released in which their song "Gold" was used.

Their debut album You Haunt Me was released on September 16, 2014.

Their song "Gold", remixed by Betablock3r, has been featured in a Cadillac advertisement.

Their single "You Haunt Me" peaked at number 3 on Sirius XM's Alt 18 countdown on Alt Nation during the week of October 18, 2014.

On March 11, 2016, the band released the song "Expectations". According to the band, "Expectations" was one of the first songs written for their second album, yet as the music grew it no longer fit with the sound of the album and is now a standalone single.

Their single "High" held the number two spot on Sirius XM's Alt 18 Countdown for three weeks and remained on the countdown for 19 weeks from April 22, 2017 to August 26, 2017. The song was featured on the television shows 13 Reasons Why, Riverdale and Lucifer and the film Happy Death Day. The song was also used by NBC on every broadcast of Sunday Night Football in 2017 and 2018.

Discography

Studio albums

Extended plays

Singles

Notes

Other releases
In October 2015, Raeko (the alter ego of Suwito) recorded the song "Back 2 U" with Maya Tuttle of American majestic rock ensemble The Colourist.

References

External links

2012 establishments in California
Musical groups established in 2012
Alternative rock groups from California
Interscope Records artists
Indie pop groups from Los Angeles
American musical trios